The LOLCat Bible Translation Project was a wiki-based website set up in July 2007 by Martin Grondin, where editors aim to parody the entire Bible in "LOLspeak", the slang popularized by the LOLcat Internet phenomenon. The project relies on contributors to adapt passages. As of March 27, 2008, approximately 61% of the text had been adapted, and Grondin stated that he hoped the entire New Testament would be complete by the end of 2008.

A book version of the website was released in 2010, containing selected extracts such as the stories of the creation of the earth, Adam and Eve, and Noah.

Writing process
In the process of adaptation, various changes were made to the source material, for example, changing the main characters to cats – e.g., Jesus Christ becomes "Happy Cat", God the "Ceiling Cat", and Satan the "Basement Cat" – while the "gifts" and "blessings" of God have become "cheezburgerz", and people in general have become "kittehs".  The style of writing employed varies, but the most devoted contributors were described as those who utilized as many as possible of the gags and themes used in the different lolcat images.

Unlike most Bible translation efforts, the LOLCat Bible Translation Project did not depend on one translator or a group of prominent ones, but on crowdsourced translation. Untranslated sections were available for translation by anyone willing to register on the wiki.  The most active members of that crowd were listed on the project's Active users list.

Critical response
The project was praised by Ben Huh, owner of the website that popularized lolcats, icanhascheezburger.com, who noted that the LOLCat Bible had inspired other religious texts to be translated into LOLspeak, such as the Qur'an, and that it has made clear that "the ability to publish is now open to anyone". An editorial in the Chicago Tribune commented, "The effort to translate the Bible into a language full of grammatical errors, hacker acronyms and Internet lingo may appear distasteful or blasphemous to some, but not to worry. Much of the translation only loosely follows the Bible. It's crowded with references to lolcats pictures and to ambiguous Internet humor, and these references can only be understood by people who spend too much time on the Web."

See also
 The Brick Testament

Notes

References

External links
 

MediaWiki websites
Electronic Bibles
Internet humor
Cats in popular culture
Religious parodies and satires